Alex Herron is a Norwegian director and photographer. He has directed over 100 music videos and has also been a jury in Alarmprisen.

Herron was presented with the Spellemannprisen award for Margaret Berger's music video of "Lifetime Guarantee", and nominated for the same award, Spellemannprisen for best music video, 6 years in a row. In 2022, he directed a horror film called Dark Windows.

Videography

Music videos

Films

References

External links
 

Norwegian music video directors
Norwegian photographers
Spellemannprisen winners
Living people
Year of birth missing (living people)